Brookfield is a census-designated place (CDP) comprising the main village in the town of Brookfield, Worcester County, Massachusetts, United States. Massachusetts Route 9 passes through the center of the village, leading east  to Spencer and west  to Ware. Massachusetts Route 148 crosses Route 9 in the village center, leading north  to North Brookfield and south  to Fiskdale.

Brookfield was first listed as a CDP after the 2010 census.

Demographics

References 

Census-designated places in Worcester County, Massachusetts
Census-designated places in Massachusetts